Tunnel is a hamlet in Broome County, New York, United States. Tunnel has a post office with ZIP code 13848.

References

Hamlets in Broome County, New York
Hamlets in New York (state)